The 1962 UCI Track Cycling World Championships were the World Championship for track cycling. They took place in Milan, Italy from 24 to 28 August 1962. Nine events were contested, 7 for men (3 for professionals, 4 for amateurs) and 2 for women.

Medal summary

Medal table

See also
 1962 UCI Road World Championships

References

Track cycling
UCI Track Cycling World Championships by year
International cycle races hosted by Italy
Sports competitions in Milan
1962 in track cycling
August 1962 sports events in Europe
1960s in Milan